Lovegety was a proximity matchmaking device introduced in Feb. 1998 in Japan by Erfolg Co.,ltd., which allowed users to find potential dates that match their personal preferences in the vicinity. Over 1,300,000 of these units were sold in Japan at an approximate price of $21.

It was the first such device, and "the first commercial attempt to move introduction systems away from the desktop and into reality". As such, it was an important precursor for other location-based social networking applications such as Nokia's Bluetooth-based Nokia Sensor, and more recent geolocation-based social applications such as StreetSpark.

There were three modes users could pre-select on the Lovegety device which reflected the mood they were currently in and hence what kind of partner they were looking for. These included “let’s just chat”, “let’s go sing some karaoke” and “get2” or "looking for love" modes. The devices could be set to interact with each other when a potential mate was within close proximity (15 feet) or to simply notify a user of others who are currently set to the same mood. 

Howard Rheingold reflects on technologies such as the Lovegety in his work and urges that as consumers we think carefully about the social implications of these technologies. Rheingold states that ‘loss of privacy is perhaps the most obvious shadow side of technological cooperation systems’.

See also

 Bluedating
 Toothing

References

External links
 Article on Wired "Love: Japanese Style"
CNN: "Japans lonely hearts find each other with Lovegety" published June 07, 1998, retrieved 4/18/2012
 The Mirror (London, England): "Is that a Lovegety in your pocket or are you just pleased to see me?" published Jul 10, 1998, retrieved 4/18/2012

Sexuality and computing
Dating
Mobile software